Aysén or Aisén is a Chilean commune located in Aysén Province, Aysén del General Carlos Ibáñez del Campo Region. It is home to the city of Puerto Aysén and to the towns of Villa Mañiguales and Puerto Chacabuco.

A note on orthography
Chile’s Instituto Geográfico Militar (IGM) prefers the spelling Aisén, as did formerly the Instituto Nacional de Estadísticas (INE). However, since 2010 the INE has conformed to the locally preferred, and overwhelmingly more frequently used, form Aysén.

Demographics
According to the 2002 INE census, Aysén had 22,353 inhabitants (11,853 males and 10,500 females), of whom 19,580 (87.6%) lived in urban areas and 2,773 (12.4%) in rural areas at that time. Between the censuses of 1992 and 2002 the population had grown by 17.1% (3,263 persons).

Administration
As a commune, Aysén is a third-level administrative division of Chile administered by a municipal council, headed by an alcalde who is directly elected every four years. The 2008-2012 alcalde is Marisol Martínez Sanchez (PS).

Within the electoral divisions of Chile, Aysén is represented in the Chamber of Deputies by René Alinco (PDC) and David Sandoval (UDI) as part of the 59th electoral district, which includes the entire Aysén del General Carlos Ibáñez del Campo Region. The commune is represented in the Senate by Antonio Horvath Kiss (RN) and Patricio Walker Prieto (PDC) as part of the 18th senatorial constituency (Aysén del General Carlos Ibáñez del Campo Region).

References

External links
 Municipality of Aysén 

Communes of Chile
Populated places in Aysén Province
1957 establishments in Chile